Maheu is a surname. Notable people with the surname include:

Shirley Maheu, a Canadian politician
Robert Maheu, an American businessman who was implicated in a plot to assassinate Fidel Castro
René Maheu, sixth director-general at UNESCO
Naama Maheu Latasi, first woman to be elected to the parliament of Tuvalu

See also 
Maheu River, a river of the L'Île-d'Orléans Regional County Municipality, Capitale-Nationale, Quebec, Canada